Indonesia participates in the 2021 Islamic Solidarity Games held in Konya, Turkey from 9 to 18 August 2022, the Games were rescheduled from 20 to 29 August 2021, the event was postponed to be held from 10 to 19 September 2021 in July 2020 by the ISSF because the original dates were coinciding with the 2020 Summer Olympics, which were postponed due to the COVID-19 pandemic. In May 2021, the ISSF postponed the event to August 2022 citing the COVID-19 pandemic situation in the participating countries.

Medalists

Competitors

The following is the list of number of competitors in the Games.

Athletics (track and field)

Men
Track and road events

Field events

Women
Track and road events

Field events

Archery

Men
Recurve

Compound

Women
Recurve

Compound

Mixed
Recurve

Compound

Cycling

Road

Men

Women

Track
Pursuit

Scratch

Omnium

Gymnastics

Rhythmic

Individual

Artistic

Women
Team

Individual

Kickboxing

Full Contact
Women

Low Kick
Men

Women

Judo

Shooting

Men

Women

Mixed

Swimming

Men

Women

Table tennis

Singles

Taekwondo

Weightlifting

Men

Women

Wrestling

Women

References

Nations at the 2021 Islamic Solidarity Games
2021
Islamic Solidarity Games